Fargo is a 1952 American Western film directed by Lewis D. Collins and starring Wild Bill Elliott, Myron Healey and Phyllis Coates. The film's sets were designed by the art director Dave Milton. It was shot at the Iverson Ranch.

Plot

Cast
 Wild Bill Elliott as Bill Martin 
 Myron Healey as Red Olsen 
 Phyllis Coates as Kathy MacKenzie 
 Fuzzy Knight as Tad Sloan 
 Arthur Space as Austin 
 Jack Ingram as MacKenzie - Rancher 
 Robert J. Wilke as Link - Henchman 
 Terry Frost as Alvord - Henchman 
 Robert Bray as Ed Murdock 
 Denver Pyle as Carey 
 Tim Ryan as Sam 
 Florence Lake as Maggie 
 Stanley Andrews as Judge Bruce 
 Richard Reeves as Bartender 
 Gene Roth as Blacksmith
 I. Stanford Jolley as Farmer 
 House Peters Jr. as Bill Martin's Brother 
 Buddy Roosevelt as Henchman

References

Bibliography
 Blottner, Gene. Wild Bill Elliott: A Complete Filmography. McFarland, 2010.
 Martin, Len D. The Allied Artists Checklist: The Feature Films and Short Subjects of Allied Artists Pictures Corporation, 1947-1978. McFarland & Company, 1993.

External links
 

1952 films
1952 Western (genre) films
1950s English-language films
American Western (genre) films
Films directed by Lewis D. Collins
Monogram Pictures films
American black-and-white films
Films scored by Raoul Kraushaar
Films with screenplays by Joseph F. Poland
1950s American films